In linguistics, an A-not-A question, also known as an A-neg-A question, is a polar question that offers two opposite possibilities for the answer. Predominantly researched in Sinitic languages, the A-not-A question offers a choice between an affirmative predicate and its negative counterpart. They are functionally regarded as a type of "yes/no" question, though A-not-A questions have a unique interrogative type pattern which does not permit simple yes/no answers and instead requires a response that echoes the original question. Therefore, to properly answer the query, the recipient must select the positive (affirmative form "A") or negative (negative predicate form "not-A") version and use it in the formation of their response. A-not-A questions are often interpreted as having a "neutral" presupposition or are used in neutral contexts, meaning that the interrogator does not presume the truth value of the proposition expressed in the question. The overarching principle is the value-neutral contrast of the positive and negative forms of a premise. The label of "A-not-A question" may refer to the specific occurrence of these question types in Mandarin or, more broadly, to encompass other dialect-specific question types such as kam questions in Taiwanese Mandarin or ka questions in Singapore Teochew (ST), though these types possess unique properties and can even occur in complementary distribution with the A-not-A question type.

Forms 
The wider category of A-not-A questions contains multiple distinct forms. These forms are differentiated on the basis of the location of the Negation constituent and the presence or absence of duplicate material.

A-not-A form 
This is the most atomic form of the A-not-A question, which contains two identical instances of the constituent A separated by negation.

AB-not-AB form 
This is a more complex form, containing two instances of the complex constituent AB separated by the negation. AB may represent an embedded clause, a subject joined with a prepositional phrase, or a verb phrase containing a DP.

A-not-AB form 
This form contains two unique constituents, A and AB, separated by the negation. A and AB are similar in that AB contains the entire content of A, but constituents are present in AB that are not present in A.

AB-not-A form 
This form is similar to the A-not-AB form, but the more complex constituent AB occurs before the negation.

a-not-A form 
This form is only found in instances where A is disyllabic constituent with initial syllable a, and the two constituents are separated by negation.

a-not-AB form 
This form is similar to the a-not-A form with a representing the initial syllable of A and the two separated by negation, but A is joined to another constituent to form the complex constituent AB.

Similar forms in English

For the English question (1.a) "Are you happy or sad?", the response to this question must be an echo answer, stating either "I am happy," or the acceptable alternative, "I am sad". In other words, this sentence is a leading question, where the speaker has an expectation as to what the answer will be. In contrast, (1.b) "Are you happy or not?" is a neutral question where the answer to this can be yes or no in response to the first and more explicitly stated alternative.

          (1.a) Q: Are you happy or sad?
                A: I am happy.
                   I am sad.
 
          (1.b) Q: Are you happy or not (happy)?
                A: Yes.
                   No. 
A-not-A questions are not usually used in English, but the following example shows how A-not-A questions are answered.

          (2) Q: Did John eat beans or not?
              A: (Yes,) John ate beans.
                 (No,) John didn't eat beans.
                 *Yes.
                 *No.

As seen in this example, simply answering "Yes" or "No" does not suffice as a response to the question. This question must be answered in the "A" or "not A" form. If this question was asked in the A-not-A pattern, its direct form would be "Did John eat or not eat the beans?".  However, the above examples also illustrate that A-not-A type questions in English usually contain some comparative operator such as "or" which is not seen in the Sinitic forms. There is also no significant evidence of either of the disyllabic A-not-A forms in English. These factors complicate the inclusion of English in the set of languages that contain the A-not-A question type, and though there are close English approximations in some cases, The A-not-A question is more accurately exemplified in Sinitic languages.

Approximations 
Below are examples of English approximations of the A-not-A question. They are similar to the Sinitic A-not-A in that they present two possibilities and require an echoed response. However, they include an extra segment ("or" in the below examples) in order to read grammatically, which changes these approximations to an alternative question (AltQ) type. This extra segment is not seen in Sinitic A-not-A questions, and in fact the Mandarin segment  haishi 'or' is used to contrast the syntax of the A-not-A form and demonstrate the latter's sensitivity to islands. Nevertheless, for the convenience of understanding this phenomenon from the perspective of an English speaker, the below examples are included to provide context.

A-not-A form 
 (1) Was John at the party or not at the party?

AB-not-A form 
 (2) Was John at the party last night or not at the party?

A-not-AB form 
 (4) Was John at the party or not at the party last night?

AB-not-AB form 
 (3) Was John at the party last night or not at the party last night?

In Sinitic

NQ Morpheme 
It is proposed that the A-not-A sequence is morpheme created by the reduplication of the interrogative morpheme (represented by the A in A-not-A). Though the specific syntactic location of this morpheme is not agreed upon, it is generally accepted that the A-not-A sequence is essentially a word formed by the concatenation of an abstract question morpheme and this duplicated predicate, which likens it to a VP-proclitic. This Morpheme is referred to as NQ in order to represent its character as negative and interrogative.

Similarity to kam-type questions 
An extensive cross-dialectic survey conducted in 1985 concluded that the Taiwanese question particle kam appears in the same contexts as the hypothesized Mandarin NQ. From this, it was concluded that kam-type questions and A-not-A questions are in complementary distribution: a language either has kam-type questions or A-not-A questions but not both. It was also interpreted that kam and NQ are "different morphological exponents of the same underlying morpheme".

Movement, sensitivity, and parallels to weishenme 'why' 
Unlike the yes/no question type formed using the segment "ma", the A-not-A question can be embedded, and may scope beyond its own clause. This scoping may be blocked if the original location of NQ and its intended final location are separated by an island boundary. These distributional characteristics of NQ are parallel to non-nominal adjunct question particle weishenme 'why'. Due to the uncontroversial nature of the movement-based analysis of weishenme, the similarity of the NQ to weishenme implies that NQ may be subject to the same analysis of its movement.

Sensitivity to islands 
The dominant view on A-not-A questions is that NQ is similar to a wh-word and related by the movement of NQ. This movement is not seen in alternative-type questions using haishi 'or', and therefore delineates A-not-A questions from alternative questions in terms of structure. Due to this syntactic differentiation, A-not-A questions may be contrasted with haishi questions for the purpose of revealing island sensitivity.

Sinitic examples 
The following are examples of A-not-A questions in languages belonging to the Sinitic linguistic family.

In Mandarin

In forming A-not-A questions, A must remain the same on both sides.  A is essentially a variable which can be replaced with a grammatical particle such as a modal, adverb, adjective, verb, or preposition.

Patterns 
In Mandarin, there are 6 attested patterns of A-not-A: A-not-A, AB-not-AB, A-not-AB, AB-not-A, a-not-A, and a-not-AB of which "A" stands for the full form of the predicate, "B" stands for the complement, and "a" stands for the first syllable of a disyllabic predicate.

A-not-A form

AB-not-AB form
Example (4) illustrates the AB-not-AB pattern, where AB is the constituent consisting of the verb , 'know', as A, and the complement , 'this CL man', as B, combining to form the AB constituent  'know this CL man'.  This produces , 'know this CL man not know this CL man.'

A-not-AB form
Example (5) illustrates the A-not-AB pattern, where A is the verb , 'know', AB is the constituent consisting of the A verb , 'know', and the complement   , 'this CL man', as B, combining to form the AB constituent  'know this CL man'.  This produces , 'know not know this CL man'.

AB-not-A form
This produces , 'know this CL man not know'.

a-not-A form

a-not-AB form
This produces , 'suit(able)-not suitable teaching fist'.

Grammatical particles used to form A-not-A questions 
A-not-A can be formed by a verb, an adjective, or an adverb, as well as modals.

Verb
In the interrogative clause, A-not-A occurs by repeating the first part in the verbal group (with the option of an auxiliary) and the negative form of the particle is placed in between. However, this clause does not apply when using perfective in aspect. Instead,  is used to replace the repeated verb used in A-not-A form.

V-NEG-V type:
Here, the verb , 'go', is A, and there is no object.

          (9.a) 你去不去？         A: 去/不去
                
                you go not go        go/not go
                DP V-NEG-V           V/NEG V
                Are you going?       Yes/No

V-NEG-V-Object type:

Here the verb , 'watch', is again A, and while there is an object, the object is not included in "A", and is therefore not reduplicated.

          (9.b) 你看不看电影？                     A: 看/不看
                
                you watch not watch movie            watch/not watch
                N V-NEG-V-N                          V/NEG V
                Will you watch the movie?            Yes/No.

V-Object-NEG type:
Here, the verb , 'watch', is likewise A, and while the object is included before NEG, it is not included in A, and is therefore not reduplicated, although it remains an option.

          (9.c) 你看电影不？                     A: 看/不看
                
                you watch movie not                watch/not watch
                N  V-DP-NEG                        V/NEG V
                Will you watch the movie?          Yes/No

V-Object-NEG-V type(debatable):
Here, the verb , 'watch', is also used for A, and while the object is included before NEG, it is not included in A, and is therefore not reduplicated. A is reduplicated here.

          (9.d) 你看电影不看？                  A: 看/不看
                
                you watch movie not watch         watch/not watch
                DP V-DP-NEG-V                     V/NEG V
                Will you watch the movie?         Yes/No

Answers to (9.a), (9.b), (9.c), and (9.d) must be in the form "V" or "not-V"

There is some debate among speakers as to whether or not 3.d. is grammatical, and Gasde argues that it is.

Adjective or adverb

A-NEG-A type:
Here, the adjective , 'good', is A, and it is reduplicated. The word  is a classifier, which means it is a counter word for the noun 'book'.

          (10.a) 这本书好不好？               A: 好/不好
                 
                 this CL book good not good     good/not good
                 DP          A-NEG-A            A/NEG A
                 Is this book good?             Yes/No

A-NEG type:
Here, the adjective , 'good', is A, but it is not reduplicated.

          (10.b) 这本书好不？                      A: 好/不好
                 
                 this CL book good not               good/not good
                 DP           A-NEG                  A/NEG A
                 Is this book good?                  Yes/No

Answers to (10.a), (10.b) must be in the form A or not-A.

Preposition

P-NEG-P type:  
Here, the preposition , 'at',  is A, and it is reduplicated.

          (11.a) 张三在不在图书馆？                  A: 在/不在
                 
                 Zhangsan at not at library            at/not at
                 DP   P-NEG-P DP                       P/NEG P
                 Is Zhangsan at the library?           Yes/No

P-NEG-P type:  
Here, the preposition , 'at', is A, and it is not reduplicated.

          (11.b) 张三在图书馆不？                A: 在/不在
                 
                 Zhangsan at library not           at/not at
                 DP  P-DP-NEG                      P/NEG P
                 Is Zhangsan at the library?       Yes/No

Answers to (11.a) and (11.b) must be in the form P or not-P.

Modal

M-NEG-M-V-Object type:
Here, the modal  is A and it is reduplicated.

          (12.a) 你敢不敢杀鸡?                       A: 敢/不敢
                 
                 you dare not dare kill chicken        dare/not dare
                 N M-NEG-M -V -DP                      M/NEG M
                 Do you dare kill chicken?             Yes/No

 The answer to (12.a) must be in the form M or not-M.

A-not-A questions in Cantonese 
Despite having the same negative marker as Mandarin, "不" bat1 is only used in fixed expressions or to give literacy quality, and only "唔" m4  is used as a negative marker in A-not-A questions.

One distinction in Cantonese when compared to Mandarin is that certain forms of A-not-A questions are not attested due to dialectal differences.

Patterns

A-not-A form 

AB-not-AB form 
As shown by (14.a), this is not an attested form in Cantonese, unlike the counterpart in Mandarin in (14.b).

Here in (14.a) A is the verb , 'like', and B the noun , 'music', producing the AB form , 'like music'.  This would produce the ungrammatical structure , 'like music not like', which is a poorly-formed sentence in Cantonese.

In the well-formed sentence shown below in (14.b), A is the verb , 'like', and B is the noun , 'music', producing the AB form , 'like music'.  This produces , 'like music not like music', a grammatical sentence in Mandarin.

A-not-AB form 
This form is only attested in Cantonese if the predicate is a monosyllabic word as shown by (15.a), where A is the verb , 'return', and AB is the constituent , 'return home'.  This can be compared to the Mandarin counterpart in (15.b) where A is the verb , 'return', and AB is the constituent , 'return home.

A-not-AB is not attested in Cantonese if the predicate is a bi-syllabic word as shown by (16.a), where A would be the verb , 'like', and AB would be the constituent , 'like music'.  This contrasts with its Mandarin counterpart in (16.b), where A is the verb , 'like', and B is the complement , music', combining into the AB form , 'like music'. In such cases, Cantonese speakers usually use the form a-not-AB, like (8).

AB-not-A form 
This form is only attested in Cantonese if the predicate is a monosyllabic word A, exemplified in (17.a) with the verb , 'return', with an object B, exemplified in (17.a) with the noun , 'home'.  (17.a) is shown below with its Mandarin counterpart in (17.b), where A is the verb , 'return', and B is the noun , 'home'.

Note that such forms of AB-not-A in monosyllabic words are used by older generations.

When the predicate is a bi-syllabic word, then AB-not-A form is not attested as shown in (18.a), unlike its Mandarin counterpart in (18.b).

In Amoy 
Amoy exhibits A-not-A forms, and differs from Mandarin and Cantonese in its frequent use of modals or auxiliaries in forming these constructions.  Amoy forms also differ in that the morphemes for A do not match each other in a given sentence.  In these constructions one of the morphemes may also be deleted, as can be seen in Examples (27), (28), and (29), though when this happens it may only be deleted from the negative predicate.

Negative markers in Amoy 
The following negative markers are used. Alternate transliterations are shown in bold.    
          (19)   a.          negative of volition (m-1)                                
                 b.          negative simplex (m-2)
                 c.         negative possessive/existential/affirmative aspect 
                              
                 d.        negative potential/possibility
                 e.         negative perfective aspect
While m-1 occurs as a free morpheme with its own semantic feature indicating volition, m-2 cannot function by itself as a verb and works only to express negation.  It is attested only with a limited amount of verbs.

A-not-A constructions 
Shown below are A-not-A constructions in Amoy.

With auxiliaries that can be used as main verbs 
The following is a list of A-not-A constructions in Amoy with auxiliary verbs which may function as the main verb of a sentence.

: 'have — not have' 
The auxiliary verb  here functions as an aspectual marker indicating that an action has been completed.  In  A-not-A constructions,  functions as the first A, corresponding with the auxiliary 'have', while  functions as the second A of the A-not-A construction, corresponding with the negative counterpart 'not have'.  Example (20) illustrates the use of this construction.

: 'to have experienced — not to have experienced' 
The auxiliary verb  functions as an aspectual marker indicating experience.  In  A-not-A constructions,  functions as the first A, corresponding with an auxiliary expressing the sense of 'to have experienced', while  functions as the second A of the A-not-A constructions, corresponding with the negative counterpart 'not to have experienced'.  Example (21) illustrates the use of this construction.

: 'to be — not to be' 
The auxiliary verb  works to express emphasis. Example (22) illustrates the use of this construction.

With auxiliaries that cannot be used as main verbs 
The following is a list of A-not-A constructions in Amoy with auxiliary verbs which may never be used as the main verb of a sentence.

: 'to want to — not to want to' 
The use of a  construction is used to express an intention or an expectation. Example (23) illustrates the use of this construction.

: 'must — must not' 
The use of a  construction expresses a sense of obligation. Example (24) illustrates the use of this construction.

: 'may — may not' 
The use of a  construction expresses a sense of permission. Example (25) illustrates the use of this construction.

: 'could — could not' 
The use of an  construction expresses a sense of possibility or probability. Example (26) illustrates the use of this construction.

: 'can, ability to do something — can't, inability to do something' 
The use of an  construction expresses a sense of the ability to do something. Example (27) illustrates the use of this construction as well as an instance of deletion from the negative predicate.

: 'could, can manage to or might — couldn't, couldn't manage or might not' 
The use of an   construction expresses a sense of a potential ability to do something. Example (28) illustrates the use of this construction as well as an instance of deletion from the negative predicate.

: 'to know how/be knowledgeable about — not to know how/be knowledgeable about' 
The use of an  construction expresses a sense of one's knowledge. Example (29) illustrates the use of this construction as well as an instance of deletion from the negative predicate.

In Korean 

The following are examples of A-not-A questions in Korean.

There are three salient morphological varieties of A-not-A question in Korean. Like all A-not-A questions, the questions can be answered with an affirmative, or negative , .

Pre-predicate negation 
Both  and  can precede the predicate in A-not-A questions.

Inherently-negative predicate 

Negative modal auxiliary

Meaning 'desist from',  follows an affirmative polar question, and will occur instead of a reduplicated full verb that has a post predicate negation, meaning that there is only one full verb in this type of A-not-A question.

However, the modal auxiliary verb  is restricted in that it does not co-occur in predicative adjectives or the factual complementizer . Moreover, with  being a bound form, it cannot be the echo negative answer. Instead, the full negative verb will be provided as the answer, taking  negation, as illustrated in (32).

Analysis: The post-syntactic approach
One analysis of the formation of the A-not-A construction is the post-syntactic approach, through two stages of M-merger. First, the A-not-A operator targets the morphosyntactic word (MWd) which is the head that is closest to it and undergoes lowering. Then, reduplication occurs to yield the surface form of the A-not-A question.

Tseng suggests that A-not-A occurs post-syntactically, at the morphological level. It is movement that occurs overtly at the phonetic form, after the syntactic movement has occurred. A-not-A is a feature of T that operates on the closest, c-commanded MWd, and not subwords (SWd). The elements that undergo post-syntactic movement are MWds. A node X  is a MWd iff X is the highest segment and X is not contained in another X. A node X is a SWd if X  is a terminal node and not an MWd. The A-not-A operation is a MWd to MWd movement.

Conditional criteria for grammatical A-not-A question derivation

A-not-A operator lowering
The A-not-A operator is defined as an MWd. The A-not-A operator can only lower to a MWd which is immediately dominated by the maximal projection that is also immediately dominated by the maximal projection of the A-not-A operator. An SWd cannot be the target for the A-not-A operator. In addition, if there is an intervening MWd or SWd between the A-not-A operator and its target, the A-not-A operation fails.

A-not-A operator lowering must satisfy four conditions:

 The A-not-A operator targets the closest MWd that is the X′-theoretic head that it c-commands.
 Closeness of the head is qualified by: (i) The closest head is a X′-theoretic head of the maximal which is immediately dominated by the maximal projection of the A-not-A operator. (ii) The target must have overt phonological realization. 
 There is not any non-X′-theoretic head or SWd intervening between the A-not-A operator and its target. 
 Intervention is defined by c-command relation.

After lowering, the A-not-A operator triggers reduplication on the target node. The reduplication domain can be the first syllable of the targeted element, the targeted element itself, and the maximal projection that contains the targeted element. Reduplication is linear and the A-not-A operator cannot skip the adjacent constituent to copy the next constituent.

Reduplication of first syllable of adjacent morphosyntactic word
In first syllable reduplication, the A-not-A operator copies the first syllable of the adjacent MWd and moves the reduplicant, i.e. copied syllable, to the left of the base MWd. Then the negation is inserted between the reduplicant and base to form a grammatical sentence. In (33.a), the A-not-A operator copies the first syllable  of the MWd . The reduplicant  is put at the left of the base  and then the negative constituent  is inserted in between. In figure (33.b)  is ungrammatical because  cannot be put to the right of the maximal projection VP, .

Reduplication of adjacent morphosyntactic word
In MWd reduplication, the A-not-A operator copies the adjacent MWd and moves the reduplicant MWd overtly to the left of the base MWd or to right of the base maximal projection containing the MWd. Otherwise, the reduplicant can move covertly, i.e. in such a way that there is no overt surface evidence, to the right of the base maximal projection containing the MWd. The negation is then inserted between the reduplicant and base to form a grammatical sentence. In (34.a) the A-not-A operator copies the MWd . The reduplicant  is overtly put at the left of the base  and then the negative constituent  is inserted in between. In (34.b) the A-not-A operator copies the MWd . The reduplicant  is overtly put at the right of the base  and then the negative constituent  is inserted in between. In (34.c) the A-not-A operator copies the MWd . The reduplicant  is covertly put at the right of the base  after which the negative constituent  is inserted.

Reduplication of the maximal projection containing adjacent morphosyntactic word
In maximal projection reduplication, the A-not-A operator copies the maximal projection that contains the adjacent MWd and moves the reduplicant either to the left or to the right of the base. The base may be just the MWd or the maximal projection containing the MWd. The maximal projection may be any XP (VP, AP, PP etc.). The negation is then inserted between the reduplicant and base to form a grammatical sentence. In (35) the A-not-A operator copies the maximal projection VP . The reduplicant  is put at the left of the base  and then the negative constituent  is inserted in between.

See also

Closed-ended question
Echo answer
Interrogative
Yes–no question

References

Human communication
Grammar
Syntax
Semantics
Types of question